Bob Hewitt and Frew McMillan were the defending champions but lost in the semifinals to Bob Lutz and Stan Smith.

Lutz and Smith won in the final 6–1, 6–2 against Heinz Günthardt and Pavel Složil.

Seeds
The draw allocated unseeded teams at random; as a result three seeded teams received byes into the second round.

Draw

Finals

Top half

Bottom half

External links
 1980 Fischer-Grand Prix Doubles draw

1980 Fischer-Grand Prix